Shin Raṭṭhasāra (1468–1529 (1530) was a Buddhist monk and prominent classical poet during the Ava Kingdom, known for his pyo poetry. His 1523 Kogan Pyo based on the Hatthipāla Jātaka, is among the most widely known pyo in modern-day Myanmar, and is taught in Burmese schools. His Buridat Pyo (based on the Bhūridatta Jātaka) is also considered an exemplar of the medieval literary style, is considered a masterpiece of Burmese classical poetry. Raṭṭhasāra also composed metrical versions of other Jataka tales, including the Saṃvarajātaka, besides a number of other poems.  

Despite his poetic contributions, Burmese chroniclers excluded him from the succession of elders (thera), because he not only wrote verse, but also recited and instructed pupils in the art of recitation, which was considered a transgression of the Vinaya, specifically the rules governing singing and dancing.

Background
Raṭṭhasāra was born on 1468 in Ava Kingdom and growing up in royal palace of Ava. Descended from royal lineage, Raṭṭhasāra was the son of Dhammapāla, a minister, a nephew of Queen Shin Sawbu; his mother was the great-granddaughter of Thado Minbya, the founder of the Kingdom of Ava.

He taught astrology, poetry and Pali under a Buddhist monk, Varacakkapāla and Thiho (Sri Lanka) Sayadaw. He began writing poems at the age of 12. At 16, he wrote Buridat Pyo. His writer rival is Shin Maha Silavamsa.

A prolific writer, he wrote many pyo, mawgun and other types of poems during his lifetime. His last work was Thanwara Pyo, based on the Saṃvarajātaka. Raṭṭhasāra died in 1529 at the age of 61.

Works
Raṭṭhasāra was a prolific writer, composing at least 17 works throughout his lifetime, including:

Catudhammasāra Pyo (စတုဓမ္မသာရပျို့)
Gambhīsāra Pyo (ဂမ္ဘီသာရပျို့)
Bhūridat Zatpaung Pyo (ဘူရိဒတ်ဇာတ်ပေါင်းပျို့)
Bhūridhāt Linkagyi (ဘူရိဓာတ်လင်္ကာကြီး)
Saṃvara Pyo (သံဝရပျို့)
Pondaungnaing Mawgun (ပုံတောင်နိုင်မော်ကွန်း)
Record of the Establishment of Ratanāpūra City (ရတနာပူရမြို့တည်မော်ကွန်း)
Mitthilā Lake Bwe Mawgun (မိတ္ထိလာကန်တော်ဘွဲ့မော်ကွန်း)
Record of the Dada-u Mingala Zedi (တန်တားဦးတည်မော်ကွန်း)
Yeyitet Mawgun (ရဲရည်တက်မော်ကွန်း)
Yadu Kabyamya Taungtetun Yadu (ရတုကဗျာများ တောင့်တဲတွန့်ရတု)
Wutyonkyaung bwe Mawgun (ဝတ်ရုံကျောင်းဘွဲ့မော်ကွန်း)
Hsommasa Linka (ဆုမ္မစာလင်္ကာ)
Letthittaungta (လက်သစ်တောင်တာဆုမ္မစာ)
Rājavasasatī Khanpaikson Yadu (ရာဇဝသသတီခဏ်းပိုက်စုံရတု)
Shweset Tawthwa Tawla (ရွှေစက်တော်သွားတော်လား)
Homily to Minkhaung II (ဒုတိယမင်းခေါင်ထံသွင်းမေတ္တာစာ)

Reference

See also 
 Burmese literature
 Pyo

Theravada Buddhist monks
Burmese Theravada Buddhists
Burmese Buddhist monks
Burmese scholars of Buddhism
Theravada Buddhism writers
1468 births
1529 deaths
Burmese male poets
15th-century Burmese poets